Fulford is a civil parish in the Borough of Stafford, Staffordshire, England.  It contains nine listed buildings that are recorded in the National Heritage List for England. All the listed buildings are designated at Grade II, the lowest of the three grades, which is applied to "buildings of national importance and special interest". The parish contains the villages of Fulford and Stallington and the surrounding area.  The listed buildings consist of houses, farmhouses, a former country house and stables, a former windmill, and a church.


Buildings

References

Citations

Sources

Lists of listed buildings in Staffordshire